Pierre Trottier (March 21, 1925 – April 9, 2010) was a Canadian novelist. He won the Prix David in 1960. He was born in Montreal, Quebec and died in the same city.

Awards
  David Price for the Sleeping Beauties 1960
  Price of the society of men of letters to The Return of Oedipus in 1964.
  Member of the Royal Society of Canada since 1978 and the Union of writers and writers Quebec

External links
Pierre Trottier entry in the Dictionary of Literary Biography
Pierre Trottier's obituary

1925 births
2010 deaths
Canadian male novelists
Writers from Montreal
20th-century Canadian novelists
20th-century Canadian male writers